Saint-Eustache may refer to:
 Eustace of Luxeuil ( 560 –  629), succeeded Saint Columbanus as the 2nd abbot of Luxeuil in Burgundy
 Saint Eustace, a Christian martyr and soldier saint, who legend places in 2nd-century Italy, patron saint of hunters and firefighters
 Saint-Eustache, Quebec, a city in western Quebec, Canada
 Saint-Eustache, Haute-Savoie, a commune in France
 Saint-Eustache, Paris, a church in Paris, France
 Sint Eustatius, one of the islands of the Caribbean Netherlands